An Hojuela, meaning "flake" in Spanish, is a traditional Spanish and American sweet baked-good. In Latin American countries, especially Colombia, it is commonly made during Holy Week and the Christmas season. Ingredients vary by region, but usually consist of a flour-based batter fried in oil and dusted with sugar.

In Colombia
Hojuelas are commonly made during the Holiday season. They are generally eaten along with manjar blanco, natillas, and buñuelos. Hojuelas are usually made with wheat flour, eggs, water, and half a cup of orange juice or less. Strips of the batter are then fried with vegetable oil.

In Chile
In Chile, hojuelas derive from a traditional recipe using palm syrup.

Spanish saying
"Miel sobre hojuelas" is a Spanish saying analogous to the English expression "Icing on the cake". Supposedly, the expression emerged when people added honey over hojuelas rather than sugar, and enjoyed the taste even more. It means something akin to making something good even better.

Alternatively, saying "No todo es miel sobre hojuelas, or "Not everything is honeyed hojuelas", means "It is not all fun and games".

References

Colombian cuisine
Desserts
Christmas food